Fakahina, or Kaīna, is a small atoll in the north of the Tuamotu group in French Polynesia. The nearest land is Fangatau Atoll, located 72 km to the north-west. There is no pass connecting the lagoon with the ocean.

Fakahina has 155 inhabitants. The main village is Tarione.

History
The first recorded European to arrive to Fakahina Atoll was Otto von Kotzebue, sailing in the service of the Russian tsars, in 1824. This atoll appears as "Predpriati" in some maps.

At the beginning of the 20th century part of the population of Fakahina was moved to Puka-Puka to work in the production of copra.

Administration
Fakahina belongs to the commune of Fangatau, which consists of Fangatau Atoll, as well as the atoll and associated commune of Fakahina.

References

Oceandots
History
Ma'ohi people
Fakahina Airport

External links
Atoll list (in French)

Atolls of the Tuamotus